The Last Glacial Maximum (LGM), also referred to as the Late Glacial Maximum, was the most recent time during the Last Glacial Period that ice sheets were at their greatest extent 26 ka - 20 ka. 
Ice sheets covered much of Northern North America, Northern Europe, and Asia and profoundly affected Earth's climate by causing drought, desertification, and a large drop in sea levels. 
Based on changes in position of ice sheet margins dated via terrestrial cosmogenic nuclides and radiocarbon dating, growth of ice sheets commenced 33,000 years ago and maximum coverage was between 26,500 years and 19–20,000 years ago, when deglaciation commenced in the Northern Hemisphere, causing an abrupt rise in sea level. Decline of the West Antarctica ice sheet occurred between 14,000 and 15,000 years ago, consistent with evidence for another abrupt rise in the sea level about 14,500 years ago. Glacier fluctuations around the Strait of Magellan suggest the peak in glacial surface area was constrained to between 25,200 and 23,100 years ago. Continental ice sheets never reached their isostatic equilibrium during the LGM, as evidenced by high variability in ice volume over short spans of time.

The LGM is referred to in Britain as the  Dimlington Stadial, dated to between 31,000 and 16,000 years.
In the archaeology of Paleolithic Europe, the LGM spans the Aurignacian, Gravettian, Solutrean, Magdalenian and Périgordian cultures.

The LGM was followed by the Late Glacial Interstadial.

Glacial climate

The average global temperature around 19,000 BC (about 21,000 years ago) was about 6 °C (11 °F) colder than today.

According to the United States Geological Survey (USGS), permanent summer ice covered about 8% of Earth's surface and 25% of the land area during the last glacial maximum. The USGS also states that sea level was about  lower than in present times (2012).

As of 2012 about 3.1% of Earth's surface and 10.7% of the land area is covered in year-round ice.

The formation of an ice sheet or ice cap requires both prolonged cold and precipitation (snow). Hence, despite having temperatures similar to those of glaciated areas in North America and Europe, East Asia remained unglaciated except at higher elevations. This difference was because the ice sheets in Europe produced extensive anticyclones above them. These anticyclones generated air masses that were so dry on reaching Siberia and Manchuria that precipitation sufficient for the formation of glaciers could never occur (except in Kamchatka where these westerly winds lifted moisture from the Sea of Japan). The relative warmth of the Pacific Ocean due to the shutting down of the Oyashio Current and the presence of large east-west mountain ranges were secondary factors preventing continental glaciation in Asia.

All over the world, climates at the Last Glacial Maximum were cooler and almost everywhere drier. In extreme cases, such as South Australia and the Sahel, rainfall could have been diminished by up to 90% compared to the present, with flora diminished to almost the same degree as in glaciated areas of Europe and North America. Even in less affected regions, rainforest cover was greatly diminished, especially in West Africa where a few refugia were surrounded by tropical grasslands.

The Amazon rainforest was split into two large blocks by extensive savanna, and the tropical rainforests of Southeast Asia probably were similarly affected, with deciduous forests expanding in their place except on the east and west extremities of the Sundaland shelf. Only in Central America and the Chocó region of Colombia did tropical rainforests remain substantially intact – probably due to the extraordinarily heavy rainfall of these regions.

Most of the world's deserts expanded. Exceptions were in what is now the western United States, where changes in the jet stream brought heavy rain to areas that are now desert and large pluvial lakes formed, the best known being Lake Bonneville in Utah. This also occurred in Afghanistan and Iran, where a major lake formed in the Dasht-e Kavir.

In Australia, shifting sand dunes covered half the continent, while the Chaco and Pampas in South America became similarly dry. Present-day subtropical regions also lost most of their forest cover, notably in eastern Australia, the Atlantic Forest of Brazil, and southern China, where open woodland became dominant due to drier conditions. In northern China – unglaciated despite its cold climate – a mixture of grassland and tundra prevailed, and even here, the northern limit of tree growth was at least 20° farther south than today. 

In the period before the Last Glacial Maximum, many areas that became completely barren desert were wetter than they are today, notably in southern Australia, where Aboriginal occupation is believed to coincide with a wet period between 40,000 and 60,000 years Before Present (BP, a formal measurement of uncalibrated radiocarbon years, counted from 1950). 

In New Zealand and neighbouring regions of the Pacific, temperatures may have been further depressed during part of the Last Glacial Maximum by the world's most recent supervolcanic eruption, the Oruanui eruption, approximately 28,500 years BP.

However, it is estimated that during the Last Glacial Maximum, low-to-mid latitude land surfaces at low elevation cooled on average by 5.8 °C relative to their present day temperatures, based on an analysis of noble gases dissolved in groundwater rather than examinations of species abundances that have been used in the past.

World impact 
During the Last Glacial Maximum, much of the world was cold, dry, and inhospitable, with frequent storms and a dust-laden atmosphere. The dustiness of the atmosphere is a prominent feature in ice cores; dust levels were as much as 20 to 25 times greater than now.  This was probably due to a number of factors:  reduced vegetation, stronger global winds, and less precipitation to clear dust from the atmosphere. The massive sheets of ice locked away water, lowering the sea level, exposing continental shelves, joining land masses together, and creating extensive coastal plains. During the last glacial maximum, 21,000 years ago, the sea level was about 125 meters (about 410 feet) lower than it is today.

Africa and the Middle East 
In Africa and the Middle East, many smaller mountain glaciers formed, and the Sahara and other sandy deserts were greatly expanded in extent.

The Persian Gulf averages about 35 metres in depth and the seabed between Abu Dhabi and Qatar is even shallower, being mostly less than 15 metres deep. For thousands of years the Ur-Shatt (a confluence of the Tigris-Euphrates Rivers) provided fresh water to the Gulf, as it flowed through the Strait of Hormuz into the Gulf of Oman.

Bathymetric data suggests there were two palaeo-basins in the Persian Gulf. The central basin may have approached an area of 20,000 km2, comparable at its fullest extent to lakes such as Lake Malawi in Africa. Between 12,000 and 9,000 years ago much of the Gulf's floor was not covered by water, only being flooded by the sea after 8,000 years ago.

It is estimated that annual average temperatures in Southern Africa were 6 °C lower than at present during the Last Glacial Maximum. This alone would however not have been enough to create a widespread glaciation or permafrost in the Drakensberg Mountains or the Lesotho Highlands. Seasonal freezing of the ground in the Lesotho Highlands might have reached depths of 2 meter or more below the surface.  A few small glaciers did however develop during the Last Glacial Maximum, in particular in south-facing slopes. In the Hex River Mountains, in the Western Cape, block streams and terraces found near the summit of Matroosberg evidences past periglacial activity which likely occurred during the Last Glacial Maximum.

Asia 
There were ice sheets in modern Tibet (although scientists continue to debate the extent to which the Tibetan Plateau was covered with ice) as well as in Baltistan and Ladakh. In Southeast Asia, many smaller mountain glaciers formed, and permafrost covered Asia as far south as Beijing. Because of lowered sea levels, many of today's islands were joined to the continents: the Indonesian islands as far east as Borneo and Bali were connected to the Asian continent in a landmass called Sundaland. Palawan was also part of Sundaland, while the rest of the Philippine Islands formed one large island separated from the continent only by the Sibutu Passage and the Mindoro Strait.

Australasia 
The Australian mainland, New Guinea, Tasmania and many smaller islands comprised a single land mass. This continent is now referred to sometimes as Sahul.

Between Sahul and Sundaland – a peninsula of South East Asia that comprised present-day Malaysia and western and northern Indonesia – there remained an archipelago of islands known as Wallacea. The water gaps between these islands, Sahul and Sundaland were considerably narrower and fewer in number.

The two main islands of New Zealand, along with associated smaller islands, were joined as one landmass. Virtually all of the Southern Alps were under permanent ice, with glaciers extending into much of the surrounding high country.

Europe 

Northern Europe was largely covered by ice, with the southern boundary of the ice sheets passing through Germany and Poland. This ice extended northward to cover Svalbard and Franz Josef Land and northeastward to occupy the Barents Sea, the Kara Sea, and Novaya Zemlya, ending at the Taymyr Peninsula in what is now northwestern Siberia.

In northwestern Russia, the Fennoscandian Ice Sheet reached its LGM extent approximately 17,000 years ago, about five thousand years later than in Denmark, Germany and Western Poland. Outside the Baltic Shield, and in Russia in particular, the LGM ice margin of the Fennoscandian Ice Sheet was highly lobate. The main LGM lobes of Russia followed the Dvina, Vologda and Rybinsk basins respectively. Lobes originated as result of ice following shallow topographic depressions filled with a soft sediment substrate.

Permafrost covered Europe south of the ice sheet down to as far south as present-day Szeged in Southern Hungary. Ice covered the whole of Iceland. In addition, ice covered Ireland and almost all of Wales, with the southern boundary of the ice sheet running approximately from the current location of Cardiff north-north-east to Middlesbrough, and then across the now submerged land of Doggerland to Denmark.

In the Cantabrian Mountains of the northwestern corner of the Iberian Peninsula, which in the present day have no permanent glaciers, the LGM led to a local glacial recession as a result of increased aridity caused by the growth of other ice sheets farther to the east and north, which drastically limited annual snowfall over the mountains of northwestern Spain. The Cantabrian alpine glaciers had previously expanded between approximately 60,000 and 40,000 years ago during a local glacial maximum in the region.

North America 

In North America, the Laurentide Ice Sheet grew rapidly at the onset of the LGM until it covered essentially all of Canada east of the Rocky Mountains and extended roughly to the Missouri and Ohio Rivers, and eastward to Manhattan, reaching a total maximum volume of around 26.5 to 37 million cubic kilometres. In addition to the large Cordilleran Ice Sheet in Canada and Montana, alpine glaciers advanced and (in some locations) ice caps covered much of the Rocky and Sierra Nevada Mountains further south. Latitudinal gradients were so sharp that permafrost did not reach far south of the ice sheets except at high elevations. Glaciers forced the early human populations who had originally migrated from northeast Siberia into refugia, reshaping their genetic variation by mutation and drift. This phenomenon established the older haplogroups found among Native Americans, and later migrations are responsible for northern North American haplogroups.

On the Island of Hawaii, geologists have long recognized deposits formed by glaciers on Mauna Kea during recent ice ages. The latest work indicates that deposits of three glacial episodes since 150,000 to 200,000 years ago are preserved on the volcano. Glacial moraines on the volcano formed about 70,000 years ago and from about 40,000 to 13,000 years ago. If glacial deposits were formed on Mauna Loa, they have long since been buried by younger lava flows.

South America 

During the Last Glacial Maximum valley glaciers in the southern Andes (38–43° S) merged and descended from the Andes occupying lacustrine and marine basins where they spread out forming large piedmont glacier lobes. Glaciers extended about 7 km west of the modern Llanquihue Lake, but not more than 2 to 3 km south of it. Nahuel Huapi Lake in Argentina was also glaciated by the same time. Over most of the Chiloé Archipelago, glacier advance peaked in 26,000 years BP, forming a long north–south moraine system along the eastern coast of Chiloé Island (41.5–43° S). By that time the glaciation at the latitude of Chiloé was of ice sheet type contrasting to the valley glaciation found further north in Chile.

Despite glacier advances much of the area west of Llanquihue Lake was still ice-free during the Last Glacial Maximum. During the coldest period of the Last Glacial Maximum vegetation at this location was dominated by Alpine herbs in wide open surfaces. The global warming that followed caused a slow change in vegetation towards a sparsely distributed vegetation dominated by Nothofagus species. Within this parkland vegetation Magellanic moorland alternated with Nothofagus forest, and as warming progressed even warm-climate trees began to grow in the area. It is estimated that the tree line was depressed about 1,000 m relative to present day elevations during the coldest period, but it rose gradually until 19,300 years BP. At that time a cold reversal caused a replacement of much of the arboreal vegetation with Magellanic moorland and Alpine species.

Little is known about the extent of glaciers during Last Glacial Maximum north of the Chilean Lake District. To the north, in the dry Andes of Central and the Last Glacial Maximum is associated with increased humidity and the verified advance of at least some mountain glaciers. In northwestern Argentina, pollen deposits record the altitudinal descent of the treeline during the LGM.

In the Southern Hemisphere, the Patagonian Ice Sheet covered the whole southern third of Chile and adjacent areas of Argentina. On the western side of the Andes the ice sheet reached sea level as far north as in the 41 degrees south at Chacao Channel. The western coast of Patagonia was largely glaciated, but some authors have pointed out the possible existence of ice-free refugia for some plant species. On the eastern side of the Andes, glacier lobes occupied the depressions of Seno Skyring, Seno Otway, Inútil Bay, and Beagle Channel. On the Straits of Magellan, ice reached as far as Segunda Angostura.

Oceans
Abyssal Pacific overturning was weaker during the LGM than in the present day, although it was temporarily stronger during some intervals of ice sheet retreat.

Evidence suggests that the Peruvian Oxygen Minimum Zone in the eastern Pacific was weaker than it is in the present day, likely as a result of increased oxygen concentrations in seawater permitted by cooler ocean water temperatures, though it was similar in spatial extent.

The outflow of North Pacific Intermediate Water through the Tasman Sea was stronger during the LGM.

Evidence from sediment cores in the Scotia Sea suggests the Antarctic Circumpolar Current was weaker during the last glaciation than during the Holocene.

See also 

Bølling oscillation
Allerød oscillation

Notes

Further reading
Developments in Quaternary Science Series

External links 

 (32 digital maps at 1:7 000 000 scale with accompanying digital chronological database and one poster (two sheets) with full map series.)

Paleoclimate Modelling Intercomparison Project (PMIP) PMIP Web Site and 'Publications : Last Glacial Maximum.
Paleoclimate Modelling Intercomparison Project Phase II (PMIP2) PMIP2 Home page and PMIP 2 Publications.

 
Ice ages
Glaciology